Plestiodon dugesii, also known commonly as Dugès' skink, Duges's skink, and eslabon in Mexican Spanish, is a species of lizard in the family Scincidae. The species is endemic to Mexico.

Etymology
The specific name, dugesii, is in honor of French-born Mexican naturalist Alfredo Dugès, who is considered to be the "father" of Mexican herpetology.

Geographic range
P. dugesii is found in central Mexico, in the Mexican States of Guanajato and Michoacán.

Habitat
The preferred natural habitat of P. dugesii is forest, at altitudes above .

Reproduction
P. dugesii is ovoviviparous.

References

Further reading
Thominot A (1883). "Note sur un Reptile d'espèce nouvelle provenant du Mexique et appartenant du genre Eumeces (Plestiodon)". Bulletin de la Société philomathique de Paris, Septième série 7: 138–139. (Eumeces dugesii, new species). (in French).
Schmitz A, Mausfeld P, Embert D (2004). "Molecular studies on the genus Eumeces Wiegmann, 1834: phylogenetic relationships and taxonomic implications". Hamadryad 28 (1–2): 73–89. (Plestiodon dugesii, new combination).
Smith HM, Taylor EH (1950). "An Annotated Checklist and Key to the Reptiles of Mexico Exclusive of the Snakes". Bulletin of the United States National Museum (199): 1–253. (Eumeces dugesii, p. 169).
Taylor EH (1943). "Mexican Lizards of the Genus Eumeces, with Comments on the Recent Literature on the Genus". University of Kansas Science Bulletin 29 (5): 269–300. (Eumeces dugesii, pp. 279–280).

dugesii
Reptiles of Mexico
Reptiles described in 1883
Taxa named by Alexandre Thominot